Levonorgestrel acetate (LNG-A), or levonorgestrel 17β-acetate, also known as 3-ketonorgestimate, is a progestin which was never marketed. It is a progestogen ester and is the C17β acetate ester and a prodrug of levonorgestrel. Norgestimate is the C3 oxime of LNG-A. The drug is a minor active metabolite of norgestimate, which is a prodrug of norelgestromin and to a lesser extent of levonorgestrel and LNG-A. LNG-A has high affinity for the progesterone receptor, about 135% of that of promegestone (relative to 150% for levonorgestrel). Along with levonorgestrel butanoate, LNG-A was investigated as a hormonal contraceptive by the Population Council.

See also
 List of progestogen esters

References

Abandoned drugs
Acetate esters
Ethynyl compounds
Androgens and anabolic steroids
Enantiopure drugs
Estranes
Human drug metabolites
Enones
Prodrugs
Progestogen esters
Progestogens